Stephen Kotromanić (also Stjepan Kotromanić, or Stefan Kotromanić) may refer to:

 Stephen I Kotromanić, ban (ruler) of medieval Bosnia (1287–1314)
 Stephen II Kotromanić, ban (ruler) of medieval Bosnia (1322–1353)

See also
Tvrtko Kotromanić (disambiguation)
Prijezda Kotromanić (disambiguation)
List of rulers of Bosnia